The Primera División de Fútbol Profesional Apertura 1999 season (officially "Copa Pilsener Apertura 2000") started on August 28, 1999, and finished on December 26, 1999.

The season saw Águila win its 12th league title after a 1-0 victory over C.D. Municipal Limeño in the final.

Key note 
After round 8 of this season, Árabe Marte reverted to their historic name of Atlético Marte.

Promotion and relegation
Promoted from Segunda División de Fútbol Salvadoreño as of 1999.
 Champions: C.D. Juventud Olimpica Metalio

Relegated to Segunda División de Fútbol Salvadoreño as of 1999.
 Last place: C.D. Sonsonate

Team information

Personnel and sponsoring

Managerial changes

Before the start of the season

During the season

League standings

Semifinals 1st Leg

Semifinals 2nd Leg

Final

Top scorers

List of foreign players in the league
This is a list of foreign players in Clausura 1999. The following players:
have played at least one apetura game for the respective club.
have not been capped for the El Salvador national football team on any level, independently from the birthplace

ADET
 

C.D. Águila
  Carlos Escalante 
  Marcio Sampaio 
  Héctor Baloyes
 
Alianza F.C.
  Agnaldo De Oliveira
   Alejandro Curbelo

Arabe Marte
  Oscar Mejía 
  Pedro Aquino
  Luis Sánchez

Dragon
  Nicolás Watson
  Edgar Osvaldo Alvarez
  Carlos Maldonado

 (player released mid season)
  (player Injured mid season)
 Injury replacement player

C.D. FAS
  Emiliano Pedrozo
  Miguel Mariano
  Jorge Wagner
  Rodriguez

C.D. Luis Ángel Firpo
  Celio Rodríguez
  Mauricio Dos Santos
  Raul Toro
  Nildeson

Juventud Olimpico
  Martín García
  Fernando Sarmiento

Municipal Limeno
  German Alexis Rodríguez
  Roberto Ventura  
  Armando García 

Santa Clara

External links

Primera División de Fútbol Profesional Apertura seasons
El
1